Turdi Akhun (1881–1956), sometimes spelled Turdu Ahun, was a traditional Uyghur folk musician in the Xinjiang region. He was born into a family with a rich musical history and could perform his music completely from memory, even into his 70s. Prior to his death he, along with Omar Akhun, made a recording of 12 muqams and was recognised as the foremost exponent of this genre.

References

Uyghur people
Uyghur music
1881 births
1956 deaths